Archbishop Prendergast High School was an all-girl Catholic high school in the Roman Catholic Archdiocese of Philadelphia. It has been merged with Monsignor Bonner High School and renamed.

It is located in Drexel Hill, Pennsylvania. The school is often referred to by its nickname, "Prendie". The school operates in a landmark building that formerly served as St. Vincent Orphanage.  The school mascot is a panda bear.

In September 2005, Bugh the Office of Catholic Education of the Archdiocese of Philadelphia announced that Archbishop Prendergast High School and the neighboring school for boys, Monsignor Bonner, would begin operating under one administration beginning in July 2006. Bonner's president, Rev. Augustine M. Esposito, O.S.A., Ph.D., was appointed President of the new co-institutional Monsignor Bonner-Archbishop Prendergast. The Principal of Archbishop Prendergast High School, Mary Haley Berner, herself an alumna of Prendergast, was named the first principal of the co-institutional school in January 2006.

Campus History
The tract of land upon which Monsignor Bonner and Archbishop Prendergast Catholic High Schools were built was originally owned by Christopher Fallon, who constructed an impressive octagonal mansion on the site in 1850. The house was named "Runnymede" after the Fallon family seat in Roscommon County in Ireland. In 1882, the unusual building was purchased by Colonel Anthony J. Drexel. The mansion stood on what was at that time called the hill of Drexel, and consequently the surrounding area became known as Drexel Hill. In 1908, the mansion burned to the ground with only the gatehouse, which had served as servants' quarters, remaining.

The orphanage replaced one demolished to allow the construction of the Benjamin Franklin Parkway. It was named St. Vincent's Orphanage. Paul Monaghan was employed as architect and commissioned to build "one of the finest buildings in the diocese." Work on the project was slowed by the war, and Archbishop Prendergast died before the work was completed.

On May 9, 1920, the dedication took place. 40,000 people, accompanied by bands and musicians, walked from 69th Street to the dedication. Another 20,000 walked from the Pennsylvania Railroad Station in Lansdowne, and 65,000 more arrived by motorcar or by trolley from 69th Street. Archbishop Dennis Dougherty and Governor Sproul spoke to the 125,000 well-wishers gathered on the front lawn and along Garrett Road.

St. Vincent's functioned as an orphanage for over 30 years. By 1952, the number of children needing care had dwindled, and the Most Reverend John F. O'Hara decided to move the remaining orphans to a smaller building in Saint David's and convert the facility into Archbishop Prendergast High School for Boys, to meet the increasing demand for a Catholic high school in the expanding western suburbs.  Three years later, the Archdiocese constructed a new building on the same tract and named it Monsignor Bonner High School in memory of Reverend John J. Bonner, the former diocesan Superintendent of Schools. Bonner then became a school for boys and Prendergast was designated as a school for girls.

In September 2005, the Office of Catholic Education of the Archdiocese of Philadelphia announced a restructuring under which both schools would operate under one administration, beginning on July 1, 2006. Bonner's president was appointed president of the new co-institutional Monsignor Bonner & Archbishop Prendergast Catholic High School. The Principal of neighboring Archbishop Prendergast High School, Mary Haley Berner, was named Principal of the co-institutional school in January 2006.

On January 6, 2012, the Archdiocese announced that both Archbishop Prendergast High School and Monsignor Bonner High School would close in June 2012, along with three other Philadelphia Catholic High Schools and 44 Catholic elementary schools as part of the 2012 Archdiocese of Philadelphia school closings.

On Friday, February 24, 2012, the Archdiocese of Philadelphia announced that Archbishop Prendergast High School and Monsignor Bonner High School were to remain open as a merged co-educational high school due to immense support from alumni and the surrounding community.

The Alma Mater
Daughters true are we to Christ our King
So in faith we hail His reign;
And as subjects loyal, His praises strong we sing

And allegiance pledge in refrain.
In us traditions live, we eagerly display 
The colors that we raise aloft, the garnet and gray.

Loyalty, devotion fill us everyone
Purity of Mary, fairer than the sun;
May our every action now pattern Mary's own.

In our God and country, let us exult,
Neath freedom's shield advance.
With His strength and teachings guiding the result

Alma Mater fair enhance!
To freedom's aid attend in forum or in fray.
His sovereign blessings fall upon the garnet and the gray!

May we, Alma Mater, faithful be to you
As we tread life's pathways in thy radiance true,
"Ut sim fidelis," our motto we renew.

Notable alumni
 Monica Horan (class of 1980), actress who starred in Everybody Loves Raymond.
 Stephenie LaGrossa (class of 1998), Survivor contestant.
 Cheri Oteri (class of 1980), comedian and former Saturday Night Live cast member.
 Elaine Van Blunk (class of 1982), long-distance runner who came third at the 1994 Chicago Marathon.

Notes and references

External links
Official website

Girls' schools in Pennsylvania
Catholic secondary schools in Pennsylvania
Roman Catholic Archdiocese of Philadelphia
Educational institutions established in 1956
Schools in Delaware County, Pennsylvania
1956 establishments in Pennsylvania